Far Eastern Federal University (Dalnevostochny federalny universitet) is a university located in Vladivostok, Primorsky Krai, Russia. In 2022 the university was ranked #1,506 in Best Global Universities by U.S. News & World Report, and in 2021 it was ranked #1,804 by Center for World University Rankings.

History
FEFU was established in 1899 during the Russian Empire era by a special order of Tsar Nicholas II as the Eastern Institute (Восточный институт) as a higher education institution specializing in oriental studies and training for administrative, commercial and industrial institutions in the Far East.  The main goal of the university was to train personnel for administrative, commercial and industrial institutions in the East Asian part of Russia and adjacent states. The main courses were the languages: Chinese, Japanese, Manchu, Korean and Mongolian, history and political organization of the Eastern states, jurisprudence etc. The university was reformed into State Far Eastern University (Государственный дальневосточный университет) by Far Eastern Republic authorities in 1920 during the Russian Civil War, until it was closed in the 1930s under Joseph Stalin. It was reinstated in 1956 as Far Eastern State University by the Council of Ministers of the USSR, two years after Nikita Khrushchev visited Vladivostok. In 2000, its English name was changed to Far Eastern National University, however the name in Russian remained unchanged and references to the university under its old name were common. In 2008, the university was reformed again by presidential decree into its current form, officially changing the name to Far Eastern Federal University and a new purpose-built campus planned. The university was merged with the Far Eastern State Technical University (FESTU), Pacific State University of Economics (TSUE) and the Ussuriisk State Pedagogical Institute (USPI).

In 2013, FEFU opened a new campus in the Russky Island area of Vladivostok after its buildings hosted the 2012 APEC summit. The campus serves FEFU's 41,000 students, and hosts the annual Eastern Economic Forum. FEFU is a participant of the Project 5-100 state program of the Russian Ministry of Education and Science.

Structure
Far Eastern Federal University consists of:

Oriental Institute – School of Regional and International Studies
School of Data Economy
School of Economics and Management
School of Education
School of Engineering
School of Humanities
School of Law
School of Medicine
School of Natural Sciences

Ratings, accreditation, and funding
In 2022 the university was ranked #1,506 in Best Global Universities by U.S. News & World Report, and in 2021 it was ranked #1,804 by Center for World University Rankings.

Far Eastern Federal University is accredited and funded by the Russian Ministry of Education. FEFU has joint academic departments with research institutes in natural sciences accredited by the Russian Academy of Sciences in the Russian Far East. In 1999, FEFU won a competition among 90  Russian Universities for a one-million US dollar grant from the American Civil Research and Development Fund. Utilizing Internet videoconference technology, FEFU pioneered several educational programs: Russian and Japanese languages, Russian-American joint credit courses in law, and international dual degree programs in business.

International relations
FEFU developed relations with Pacific Rim countries. The university has 40+ branches in Russia, the United States, Japan, China, and South Korea. It developed more than 80 partnership projects, including 64 academic exchange programs, with universities at the United States, Japan, China, South Korea, New Zealand, Taiwan, the United Kingdom, France, Australia, Thailand, India, and Vietnam.

International programs
FEFU offers international programs combining Internet and face-to-face modes of learning. However, with the war Russia launched against Ukraine in 2022, many of these partnerships are now paused or closed.

A dual degree program with University of Maryland University College (UMUC), USA, started in 1991 as a classical face-to-face program. In 1999 it became one of the first online dual degree programs in Russia. By October 2003, 265 FEFU students graduated from UMUC with bachelor's degrees in Business and Management, along with their Russian university degrees. Since 1999, UMUC accepts 90 FEFU credits of 120 credits total, required for the undergraduate degree, and offers ten online courses for the remaining 30 credits. Another dual degree program with University of Southern Queensland (USQ), Australia, started in 2001. USQ participates in  a number of such programs, but FENU was its first Russian university affiliate.

Partner institutions

Australia
University of Southern Queensland

Malaysia
Universiti Tunku Abdul Rahman

United States
University of Maryland Global Campus

Notable alumni
Leonid Korotkov
Ilya Lagutenko
Aned Y. Muñiz Gracia
Mikhail Kim

See also 
Japan Campus of Foreign Universities

References

External links
Far Eastern Federal University
Study in Russia
 Far Eastern Federal University
Far Eastern Federal University Russian Language Program (in English and several other languages)
 Far Eastern Federal University Research and Education Center for Marine Biota
Emblem and Motto of Far Eastern Federal University 

Far Eastern Federal University
Education in the Soviet Union
Educational institutions established in 1899
1899 establishments in the Russian Empire
Federal universities of Russia